The Florida Instructional League (FIL), sometimes known informally as "instructs", is an American professional baseball league. The league was founded in 1958. Young major league prospects hone their skills in the FIL, while experienced players may go there to rehabilitate from an injury, to learn a new position or to refine a particular skill. The league plays its games in September and October.

History
The Florida Instructional League was founded in 1958. Many MLB players have spent time in the league, including Pete Rose, Joe Torre, Boog Powell, Gary Carter, and Steve Carlton. 

In 1968, Boston Red Sox outfielder Tony Conigliaro played in the league to attempt a comeback as a pitcher after suffering an injury to the face and eye the year before. Conigliaro did not make it as a pitcher, but he returned to the major leagues as an outfielder.

Whitey Herzog received his first managerial opportunity in the FIL, leading the team fielded by the New York Mets organization. Several former major league stars have served as coaches in the league, including Ted Williams, Willie Mays and Ted Simmons. Lou Brock coached in the league while still an active player for the St. Louis Cardinals.

References

Baseball leagues in Florida
Professional sports leagues in the United States
1958 establishments in Florida
Sports leagues established in 1958